The 1953 Gator Bowl was a post-season college football bowl game between the Tulsa Golden Hurricane of the Missouri Valley Conference and the Florida Gators representing the Southeastern Conference (SEC). Florida defeated Tulsa, 14–13. This was the Gators' first appearance in an NCAA-sanctioned bowl game.

Game summary
An extra point by Rick Casares proved the difference. Florida outrushed the Golden Hurricane 233 to 182, while Tulsa outpassed the Gators 132 to 101. The Golden Hurricane turned the ball over twice, while Florida turned it over five times. This was the first Gator Bowl where more than one player was be awarded MVP honors, which was done until 2011.

Florida - Rick Casares, 2-yard touchdown run (Casares kick)
Florida - J. Hall, 37-yard touchdown pass from Fred Robinson (Casares kick)
Tulsa - J. C. Roberts. 3-yard touchdown run (Tom Miner kick)
Tulsa - Howard Waugh, 2-yard touchdown run (kick failed)

References

Gator Bowl
Gator Bowl
Tulsa Golden Hurricane football bowl games
Florida Gators football bowl games
20th century in Jacksonville, Florida
January 1953 sports events in the United States
Gator Bowl